The British rugby league system is based on a five-tier structure administered by the Rugby Football League.

There is no system of automatic promotion and relegation between all five tiers although teams have moved between them in the past. Since the 2015 season, the act of promotion and relegation has been re-introduced in the form of a new format including end-of-season play-offs across a variety of different leagues, however automatic promotion and relegation between the varying leagues (such as the professional leagues and the NCL) still does not exist.

Professional Clubs

The top three divisions in Britain contain professional (or semi-professional) clubs consisting of the following:

*capacity for Rugby League games may differ from official stadium capacity.

Non-British clubs

 Catalans Dragons
In 2005 the new franchise was awarded to Catalans Dragons to play in the 2006 Super League. To help make sure the franchise did not fail as the PSG franchise did, the RFL allowed the Dragons to sign players from other French teams for no transfer fee. They were also promised to be exempted from relegation for 3 years. In their first season they finished bottom of the league but Castleford Tigers were the team relegated. Over the next few years they continually improved and in 2007 they became the first French team to reach a Challenge Cup Final. In 2018 they were the first non-British team to win the Challenge Cup.

 Toulouse Olympique
In 2009 Toulouse applied for a Super League licence but failed; however, the RFL were impressed with their application and invited them to play in the Championship. In their first season they finished the season 10th but were not relegated due to it being their first season in the British structure. In their second season they improved finishing 8th but missing out on the playoffs. In 2011 they were relegated but chose to return to the French Elite One Championship after they failed to get into Super League. In 2015 it was announced the RFL had invited them to play in League 1 from 2016 in the hope they can get promoted to Super League. Toulouse now play in the Championship, having earned promotion in their inaugural League 1 season of 2016.

History

Evolution of the professional structure

The first season of rugby league (1895–96) saw all the clubs play in a single league competition. The addition of new teams and the problems of travelling led to the league being split in two for the following season; into the Yorkshire League and the Lancashire League. In the 1897–98 season Lancashire added professional second and third competitions, but the third competition only lasted one season. Yorkshire added a professional second competition (split west and east to reduce travelling) for the 1898–99 season. The bottom teams from the senior competition played a promotion/relegation test match against the winner of their county's second competition. This arrangement lasted until the 1901–02, when the top clubs from each league formed a single new competition. This saw the Lancashire and Yorkshire Senior Leagues elect numerous clubs from the second competitions (5 from Lancashire and 7 from Yorkshire) with the second competitions subsequently scrapped and teams excluded from the senior competitions joining either the Lancashire Combination (reserve grade) and a new Yorkshire Senior League or reverting to amateur status, either within the Northern Union or in the case of many Yorkshire clubs back to rugby union. However, many clubs folded and some even switched to association football. The following season most of the remaining clubs in the Yorkshire and Lancashire Leagues were re-organised to form a Second Division, although four teams from the Yorkshire League and two from the Lancashire league were not elected to the new second division (but South Shields who had played in no league in 1901–02 were).

In 1905–06, the two divisions were re-combined into a single competition. Initially clubs arranged all their own fixtures with the condition that they had to play teams they do play both home and away. After this a new structure was introduced where clubs played all the teams in their own county on a home-and-away basis, results counting towards the re-formed Yorkshire and Lancashire Leagues, although due to imbalance in number of teams it was common for a Yorkshire club to have to play in the Lancashire League. They also had home-and-away fixtures scheduled against a small number of teams in the other competition (usually three); all results were collated into a single table for the Championship. In order to even up the competition a top-four play-off series was used to determine the Championship.

Apart from the interventions of the world wars, this system was retained until 1962–63, when the league briefly returned to a two divisional system. This lasted only two seasons, and in 1964–65 they went back to one large division subdivided into county leagues, but the play-off were expanded to the top 16 teams.

In 1973–74 they again went back to two divisions. The play-off and the Yorkshire and Lancashire League were abandoned, though a new play-off type competition, the Club Championship was introduced to replace the championship play-offs.

The following season saw the title change to Premiership and the format was altered so that only the top eight teams in the First Division would compete. A similar competition was later instituted for clubs in the lower league(s). In the 1991–92 and 1992–93 seasons, a Third Division was played. However, the league reverted to two divisions for the 1993–94 and 1994–95 seasons, controversially demoting three clubs to the National Conference League in the process.

Super League, National Leagues and the Championships

In 1996 the Premiership was replaced by the Super League. The clubs outside of Super League played in the First Division which now came under Super League, and the clubs that previously played in Division Three now played in a retitled the Second Division.

Between 1999 and 2002, rugby league below Super League was re-organised into one large competition, the Northern Ford Premiership. In 2003, the NFP was divided into National Leagues 1 and 2 with a National League 3 made up from sides drawn from the Rugby League Conference and British Amateur Rugby League Association winter leagues. It was intended that at some future point promotion and relegation would be allowed between National League 3 and National League 2, however, in 2006 National League 3 was rebranded Rugby League Conference National Division and plans for promotion and relegation were scrapped.

In 2009, the National Leagues were renamed the Co-operative Championship and Championship 1. Between 2009 and 2014 automatic promotion and relegation between Super League and the Championship was replaced by a franchise system. Teams in the Championship would have to apply for a licence to play in Super League. Licences were reviewed every 5 years.

2015 new structure

In 2013, it was announced that there was to be a review into the structure of the Rugby League system in Europe. Clubs, fans and sponsors were asked about their needs from the system. Three options were reviewed; one system using two leagues of 10, with the Super League and Championship having one promotion and relegation place between the two. The format of promotion was to be decided later. The second option was the same system, with Promotion and Relegation between the two, but with 12 teams in each division. The third option was most radical, and featured two leagues of 12, which would, after 11 games, split to three groups of 8. This would be mixed with a new funding structure. On 17 January 2014, it was announced the third option had been selected, but had been changed to split after 23 games, which would be a complete round-robin and an added fixture, the Magic Weekend. From 2015, this was decided to be the new structure.

In preparation for the new structure, it was decided across the two leagues, Championship and Super League, there would be a season of realignment, in which five clubs would be relegated from the Championship, and one promoted to the Championship, and two teams would be relegated from the Super League to the Championship. This meant that the Super League, from 2015, would be made up of the 12 remaining teams from the Super League XIX season, and a Championship made up of the two relegated teams from the Super League, one team promoted from the 2014 Championship 1 and the nine remaining Championship teams. League 1, which would be modelled on the Championship, would be made out of the five relegated Championship teams, 8 current League 1 teams, and Coventry Bears.

Professional structure

Tier 1: Super League

The league pyramid of rugby league in the United Kingdom is topped and very much dominated by Super League, with the 11 top teams from England and 1 in France. The top four teams enter the play-offs and the winner is determined by a Grand Final.

Automatic promotion and relegation from Super ended in 2007. Fourteen teams were awarded 2009–11 Super League licences which gave them the right to play in Super League for the next three years. The next round of franchising took place in 2011 for the 2012–14 time frame. Only teams in Super League, or those who appeared in at least one Championship grand final or won the Championship Cup, were eligible to apply. Crusaders Rugby League, which had recently exited administration, withdrew their application for a licence, resulting in the end of Welsh presence in Super League for the immediate future. Their place in Super League was taken up by Widnes Vikings. Crusaders folded after the 2011 season and a phoenix club emerged in League 1 called North Wales Crusaders.

Promotion and relegation was reintroduced in 2015. The bottom four teams in Super League play the top four teams in the Championship in their own league of 8. The top 3 teams earn a place in the next seasons Super League while teams finishing 4th and 5th play each other in the Million Pound Game for the final Super League place.

This system was stopped in 2018 now leaving in place a one up - one down promotion and relegation style from 2019.

Tier 2: Championship

Below the Super League, is the Championship. A play-off structure was used to determine the winners of the Championship between 2008–14 and there was no promotion to Super League. In 2015 the top 4 Championship teams create a league of 8 with the bottom 4 Super League teams, the top 3 earn Super League places and 4th and 5th play each other for the final place. The bottom 8 Championship teams carry the points they earned in the regular season forward and play each other one more time. The top four then enter a playoff for the Championship Shield and the bottom two teams are relegated to League 1.

Currently the top team gets the league leaders shield at the end of the season, with a simple play off where 2nd play 5th and 3rd play 4th in the semi finals and the winners of these meet in the elimination final. The winner of the elimination final plays the league leaders to decide who is promoted to the Super League in what is billed the Million Pound Game.

The reserve teams of the Super League clubs play in the reserve team championship (except Catalans Dragons, whose reserves play in the French Elite League) and the reserve teams of some Championship clubs play in the reserve team first division. The reserve team of Toulouse Olympique also plays in the French Elite League.

Tier 3: League 1

Two teams are promoted to the Championship. The top team at the end of the season wins the league championship and earns automatic promotion. The second promotion place is determined by a knockout play-off among the next four teams in the league. The semi-final pairings are 2–5 and 3–4, and the higher seed hosts all matches.

The league was previously called Championship 1 and had 8 teams but was expanded to 14 in 2015 with the restructure of the professional leagues in 2015, and further expanded to 15 with the addition of Toulouse Olympique in 2016 and to its current number of 16 teams with the entry of the Toronto Wolfpack in 2017. New professional teams all enter at this division; below are the National Conference League and Conference League South which run parallel to one another. The French Elite One Championship is also below League 1. There is no promotion or relegation between these divisions but teams can be promoted via an application to the Rugby Football League (RFL).

As of 2019, only 14 clubs exist in League 1 due to Hemel Stags, Oxford Rugby League and Gloucestershire All Golds all pulling out of the competition in the past two years.

Amateur structure

Tier 4: NCL

National Conference League
Premier Division
Division One
Division Two
Division Three
Southern Conference League

The highest amateur league is the National Conference League which consists of four divisions (Premier Division, Division One, Division two and Division Three) of up to 14 teams each. There is promotion and relegation between each division – three up and three down. The bottom two teams from Division Three face re-election, but usually they are both re-elected as enough teams resign from the league to allow any new teams to enter.

Teams from regional leagues can apply for election to the Conference League if they meet minimum criteria. There is never automatic promotion or relegation from regional leagues into the National Conference League structure or from National Conference League to the Professional Leagues

Tier 5: regional leagues
The now defunct Rugby League Conference was abolished and replaced with a series of regional leagues from 2012 with the inclusion of many clubs that formerly played in the winter.

Summer
Yorkshire Men's League 
North West Men's League
Cumberland League
Midlands Rugby League
North East Rugby League
South West Rugby League
West of England Rugby League
East Men's League
South Premier
London & South East Men's League
Barrow & District League
Scottish Conference League
North Wales Conference
South Wales Premiership
 
British Amateur Rugby League Association administer different amateur competitions which run throughout the winter in the heartlands.

Winter
North West Counties League
CMS Yorkshire League
Pennine League
Hull & District League

Men's structure
Professional structure since 2009; Amateur structure since 2012; Number of clubs have varied by year.

Historical pyramids
From 2003 to 2009 (professional) and 2012 (amateur)

From 1999 (professional) and 1997 (amateur) to 2003

Initiation to 1999 (professional) and 1997 (amateur)

Women's structure
Structure from 2024.

Historical pyramids
Structure from 2017 to 2023.

See also

Rugby league in the British Isles
Australian rugby league system
French rugby league system
List of rugby league clubs in Britain

Notes

References

External links

Rugby league in the United Kingdom
Sports league systems